The Kuba uezd was a county (uezd) within the Baku Governorate of Russian Empire and then of Azerbaijan Democratic Republic and Azerbaijan SSR until its formal abolition in 1929 by Soviet authorities. The uezd was located in northern part of the Baku Governorate, bordering Caspian sea to the east, Elizavetpol Governorate to the west, Dagestan Oblast to the north, the Geokchay, Shemakha, and Baku uezds to the south. The administrative center of the uezd was the city of Kuba (present-day Quba).

Administrative divisions 
The subcounties (uchastoks) of the Kuba uezd in 1912 were as follows:

Geography
The uezd was located on the northern slope of the eastern part of Greater Caucasus mountain range, mainly consisting of 3 main parts: Mountains, which occupies most parts of the south-west, foothills, covering most of the uezd from southwest to northeast, and lowlands, mostly in the areas bordering the Caspian sea. The highest point in the uezd, Shahdagh, is located at the western part of the uezd at 13,951 feet.

The three main rivers in the uezd were Qudyal, Gilgil and Qusarchay. The Samur river formed the northern border.

History
After the capture of the Quba Khanate by the Russian forces in 1806, during the Russo-Persian War (1804–1813), the khanate was removed and was made a province of the Russian Empire. The uezd was created in 1840 and was initially made part of the Caspian Oblast in the same year, and later part of the Shamakhi Governorate in 1846. Due to an earthquake in Shamakhi in 1859, the centre of the Shamakhi Governorate was moved from Shamakhi to Baku and the governorate was renamed Baku Governorate.

In 1918, after the collapse of the Russian Empire, Azerbaijan became part of Transcaucasian Democratic Federative Republic. After the establishment of the Baku Commune in April 1918, clashes began in the city of Baku and other uezds within the Baku Governorate, called the March Days, during which 12,000 Azerbaijanis and other Muslims and 2,500 Armenians died.

On 28 May 1918, the Azerbaijan Democratic Republic declared its independence and the uezd was kept as part of its administrative units. After the Red Army invasion of Azerbaijan in 1920, Azerbaijan was integrated into the Soviet Union and the uezd was abolished by Soviet authorities in 1929.

Demographics

Russian Empire Census 
The plurality of the population indicated Tatar to be their mother tongue, with significant Tat, Kyurin, and Kazi-Kumukh speaking minorities.

Kavkazskiy kalendar 

Soviet census (1926) 
In 1926, the population of the uezd rose to 189,916 people, of which 17,902 were urban and 172,014 rural.

Notes

References

Bibliography 

Geographic history of Azerbaijan
States and territories established in 1840
1840 establishments in the Russian Empire
1929 disestablishments in the Soviet Union
Uezds of Baku Governorate
Uezds of the Soviet Union
States and territories disestablished in 1929